Lindzi James Tyger Drew-Honey (born 26 January 1996) is an English actor and television presenter. He is best known for his role as Jake Brockman in the British sitcom Outnumbered, Citizen Khan as Richard Scab before later appearing in Horrid Henry: The Movie and the television series Cuckoo.

Early life
Tyger Drew-Honey is the son of pornographic film stars Ben Dover and Linzi Drew. He was educated at Danes Hill School, in Oxshott, followed by Epsom College.

Career

Acting and presenting
Between 2007 and 2016, Drew-Honey played Jake Brockman in the British sitcom Outnumbered. Other appearances have included The Armstrong & Miller Show and Doctors. He co-presented the CBBC series Friday Download from 2011 until 2012. He played Mr. Lovett in The Ministry of Curious Stuff for CBBC and the role of Dylan in the BBC Three sitcom Cuckoo (2012–2019).

He has done more than 200 voiceovers for television and radio, including for Red Bull and Dell, and was the voice of Lester Large in the children's animated series The Large Family. He was a presenter on the CBBC show Friday Download.

In 2014, Drew-Honey started presenting his own documentary series on BBC Three called Tyger Takes On..., presenting on pornography, the "perfect body", love, sexuality, and sexism. In this series he stated that he might be bisexual, clarifying his belief in a sexuality spectrum where he is not entirely straight.

In 2015, Drew-Honey appeared in the four-part series 24 Hours in the Past, along with five other celebrities, to experience what life was like in Victorian Britain. He also had guest roles in Citizen Khan, Midsomer Murders, and Death in Paradise. In 2016, he took part in the E4 dating series Celebs Go Dating. In 2018, he co-presented Episode 33 of The Calum McSwiggan Show on FUBAR Radio.

Drew-Honey has also appeared in a number of driving and car maintenance videos.

Film
He starred as Stuck-Up Steve in the 2011 film Horrid Henry: The Movie and had a role in the 2015 film Up All Night.

Music
In October 2011, Drew-Honey and his co-stars from Outnumbered, Daniel Roche and Ramona Marquez, covered "(Theme From) The Monkees" to raise funds for the BBC charity campaign Children in Need. A music video featuring them performing the song on the set of Outnumbered appeared on the Children in Need programme and was released on YouTube in November 2011.

Filmography

Film

Television

Radio

Awards
Drew-Honey was nominated for Best Male Newcomer at the 2009 British Comedy Awards for his role in Outnumbered, but lost to Charlie Brooker.

References

External links

Official website

1996 births
Living people
21st-century English male actors
English male child actors
English male film actors
English male radio actors
English male television actors
English television presenters
People educated at Epsom College
People from Epsom
People from Walton-on-Thames